The Bayer designations j Puppis and J Puppis are distinct. Due to technical limitations, both designations link here. For the star

j Puppis, see 11 Puppis
J Puppis, see HD 64760

See also
 QW Puppis (I Puppis)

Puppis, j
Puppis